Grover William "Deacon" Jones (born April 18, 1934) is a retired American professional baseball player, coach, manager and scout. He appeared in 40 Major League games as a first baseman and pinch hitter for the Chicago White Sox (1962–63; 1966).

In his 11-year minor-league career (1955–56; 1959–67; 1969), Jones  with 154 home runs and a slugging percentage .  His big-league experience consisted of 60 plate appearances and he  (14 hits in 49 at bats) with one home run (hit off Jim Hannan of the Washington Senators on September 28, 1963) and 10 runs batted in.  A great natural hitter, Jones still holds the Midwest League record for the highest single-season batting average when he  for the Dubuque Packers in 1956.  He also had 135 hits, smashed 26 homers and had  slugging percentage in only 330 at bats.

After retiring as a player, Jones served as a scout and minor-league coach and manager in the White Sox organization through 1973.  Jones was a coach for the Houston Astros from 1976–82, and with the San Diego Padres from 1984–87. Jones joined the Baltimore Orioles as a minor-league hitting coach and liaison with minority communities.

Jones is currently serving as the special assistant to the president for the Sugar Land Skeeters, a member of the independent Atlantic League of Professional Baseball.

References

External links
, or Retrosheet, or SABR Biography Project

1934 births
Living people
African-American baseball coaches
African-American baseball players
Appleton Foxes players
Baltimore Orioles scouts
Baseball players from New York (state)
Chicago White Sox players
Chicago White Sox scouts
Dubuque Packers players
Fox Cities Foxes players
Houston Astros coaches
Indianapolis Indians players
Lincoln Chiefs players
Lynchburg White Sox players
Major League Baseball first basemen
Major League Baseball hitting coaches
Minor league baseball coaches
People from White Plains, New York
Rapiños de Occidente players
San Diego Padres coaches
San Diego Padres (minor league) players
Sarasota Sun Sox players
Waterloo White Hawks players
21st-century African-American people
20th-century African-American sportspeople
Florida Instructional League White Sox players
Charleston White Sox players
American expatriate baseball players in Venezuela
Minor league baseball managers
White Plains High School alumni